Monarda clinopodia, commonly known as white bergamot, basil bee balm or white bee balm, is a perennial wildflower in the mint family, Lamiaceae. This species is native to North America, ranging north from New York, west to Missouri, and south to Georgia and Alabama. M. clinopodia has also been introduced into Vermont and Massachusetts.

Description 
Monarda clinopodia is a perennial herb, growing  in height.  Leaves are simple and opposite.  Leaf margins have teeth.  Leafy bracts white or white-tinged.  Corolla is white or pink, dark-spotted, 1.5 – 3 cm long.  Flowers are bilateral with four petals, sepals, or tepals in each flower fusing into a cup or tube.

It grows in moist woods, thickets, ravines, and stream-banks.  Flowers late June to early September. The plant attracts bees, bumblebees, butterflies, and hummingbirds.

References 

Plant anatomy
clinopodia
Flora of North America
Taxa named by Carl Linnaeus